"Paradise" is a song by American rapper LL Cool J featuring American singer Amerie. The song was released on December 14, 2002, as the second single from LL Cool J's ninth studio album, 10 (2002). It also appears on the soundtrack to the 2003 film Deliver Us from Eva, in which LL Cool J stars alongside Gabrielle Union. Singer Tweet was originally slated to provide vocals but Amerie was eventually chosen instead. On the August 12, 2022 edition of The Breakfast Club, 50 Cent revealed that he ghostwritten LL’s verses on the song. "Paradise" embodies portions of Keni Burke's 1982 song "Risin' to the Top", penned by Burke, Allan Felder, and Norma Jean Wright.

Music video
A music video, featuring clips from Deliver Us from Eva, was produced to promote both the single and the film.

Track listings
UK CD single
"Paradise" (Album Version featuring Amerie) – 4:35
"Paradise" (James Yarde Mix featuring Terri Walker) – 5:22
"Paradise" (Instrumental) – 4:42
"Paradise" (featuring Amerie) (music video) – 4:21

European CD single
"Paradise" (Radio Edit featuring Amerie) – 4:04
"Paradise" (Album Version featuring Amerie) – 4:35
"After School" (Album Version featuring P. Diddy) – 4:39
"Paradise" (featuring Amerie) (music video) – 4:21

Australian CD single
"Paradise" (Radio Edit featuring Amerie) – 4:04
"Paradise" (Album Version featuring Amerie) – 4:35
"After School" (featuring P. Diddy) – 4:39
"LL Cool J Megamix"
"Paradise" (featuring Amerie) (music video) – 4:21

US 12-inch single
A1. "Paradise" (Radio Version featuring Amerie)
A2. "Paradise" (LP Version featuring Amerie)
A3. "Paradise" (Instrumental)
B1. "After School" (Radio Version featuring P. Diddy)
B2. "After School" (LP Version featuring P. Diddy)
B3. "After School" (Instrumental)

European 12-inch single
A1. "Paradise" (featuring Amerie) – 4:35
B1. "Paradise" (James Yarde Mix featuring Terri Walker) – 5:22
B2. "Paradise" (Instrumental) – 4:42

Charts

Weekly charts

Year-end charts

Release history

References

2002 songs
2003 singles
Amerie songs
Def Jam Recordings singles
LL Cool J songs
Music videos directed by Benny Boom
Song recordings produced by Trackmasters
Songs written for films
Songs written by Allan Felder
Songs written by Amerie
Songs written by Jean-Claude Olivier
Songs written by LL Cool J
Songs written by Samuel Barnes (songwriter)